1831 Nicholson, provisional designation , is a stony asteroid of the Baptistina family from the inner regions of the asteroid belt, approximately  in diameter. It was discovered on 17 April 1968, by Swiss astronomer Paul Wild at the Zimmerwald Observatory near Bern, Switzerland. The S-type asteroid has a rotation period of 3.2 hours. It was named for American astronomer Seth B. Nicholson.

Orbit and classification 

According to a HCM-analysis by David Nesvorný, Nicholson is a member of the Baptistina family, located within the greater Flora family a giant asteroid clan and the largest family of stony asteroids in the asteroid belt. Conversely, and since the existence of a proper Flora family has been ruled out by other astronomers, Nicholson has also been classified as a background asteroid.

It orbits the Sun in the inner main-belt at a distance of 2.0–2.5 AU once every 3 years and 4 months (1,224 days; semi-major axis of 2.24 AU). Its orbit has an eccentricity of 0.13 and an inclination of 6° with respect to the ecliptic.

Naming 

This minor planet was named by the discoverer in memory of American astronomer Seth B. Nicholson (1891–1963), who pioneered in several branches of planetary research at Mount Wilson Observatory and who discovered four of Jupiter's numerous moons – namely, Sinope, Lysithea, Carme, and Ananke. The lunar crater Nicholson and the dark terrain of Nicholson Regio on Jupiter's moon Ganymede, as well as the impact crater Nicholson on Mars have also been named after him. The official  was published by the Minor Planet Center on 15 October 1977.

Physical characteristics 

In the SMASS classification, Nicholson is a common stony S-type asteroid.

Rotation period 

Lightcurve analysis gave a well-defined rotation period of  hours and a brightness variation of 0.24 magnitude. At the same time, Serbian astronomer Vladimir Benishek at the Belgrade Observatory determined a concurring period of  hours with an amplitude of 0.29 magnitude.

Diameter and albedo 

According to the survey carried out by the NEOWISE mission of NASA's Wide-field Infrared Survey Explorer, Nicholson measures 7.1 and 8.1 kilometers in diameter and its surface has an albedo of 0.39 and 0.296, respectively. The Collaborative Asteroid Lightcurve Link assumes an albedo of 0.24 – derived from 8 Flora, the namesake of the Flora family – and calculates a diameter of 8.58 kilometers based on an absolute magnitude of 12.5.

References

External links 
 Asteroid Lightcurve Database (LCDB), query form (info )
 Dictionary of Minor Planet Names, Google books
 Discovery Circumstances: Numbered Minor Planets (1)-(5000) – Minor Planet Center
 
 

001831
Discoveries by Paul Wild (Swiss astronomer)
Named minor planets
001831
19680417